Events in the year 1782 in Norway.

Incumbents
Monarch: Christian VII

Events

Arts and literature
 The anti-union song «Norges Skaal» is first published. It was first written in 1771 by Johan Nordahl Brun.

Births
5 June - Ulrik Frederik Anton de Schouboe, civil servant and politician (died 1863)
8 September - Johan Gørbitz, painter (died 1853)
14 September - Christian Magnus Falsen, statesman, jurist, and historian (died 1830)
30 December - Jonas Anton Hielm, jurist and politician (died 1848)

Full date unknown
Peder Nielsen Hemb, politician
Mads Lauritz Madsen, politician (died 1840)
Ole Christian Andersen Nøstvig, politician
Niels Arntzen Sem, politician (died 1859)
Peder Tonning, politician (died 1839)

Deaths

See also